Joan, Lady Zuckerman (born Lady Joan Alice Violet Isaacs; 19 July 1918 – 25 March 2000) was a British hostess, writer and painter.

Life
Zuckerman was born in Sussex in 1918. Her mother was the Honourable Eva Violet Mond, President of the National Council of Women. Her father was the politician Gerald Isaacs, 2nd Marquess of Reading.

In 1939, Zuckerman married the scientist Solly Zuckerman, Baron Zuckerman, OM, KCB, FRS (1904–1993). They were both friends with prominent members of the Labour Party including Hugh and Dora Gaitskell and Roy and Jennifer Jenkins.

In 1950 she and her husband were involved with organising a meeting of the British Association for the Advancement of Science in Birmingham. Scientist Henry Tizard and Nobel laureate Patrick Blackett were among their house guests and formal attire was required.

The artist Alfred Cohen's wife Diana opened a gallery which made them friends, notably Zuckerman. Diana gave Zuckerman an exhibition and the gallery were then surprised to receive a day's notice of a visit by the Queen Mother and her entourage.

In 1979 the book The Birmingham Heritage was published. She had co-written this with Geoffrey Eley. The book carried a foreword written by the politician, Roy Jenkins. She had an artist friend of hers to sketch Roy's portrait.

Death and legacy
Zuckerman died in Burnham Thorpe in 2000. One of her paintings in the Sainsbury Centre collection.

Private life
She was said to have a happy marriage. They had two children Paul and Stella. Stella died in 1992.

References

1918 births
2000 deaths
People from Sussex
British painters
British women painters
British baronesses
Daughters of British marquesses
Wives of knights